Taryk Sampson (born 5 March 1997) is a Trinidadian professional footballer who plays as a centre-back for I-League club NEROCA.

Club career
Born in Trinidad and Tobago, Sampson initially signed with the Trinidadian club North East Stars in 2013. He had no appearance in the senior squad. He made his senior debut with TT Pro League side Ma Pau in the 2016–17 season, playing for them a couple of times. He was contracted with the club until July 2017. On 1 July 2017, he joined Central, another TT Pro League team, where he remained until 2019.

By mid-2019, Sampson signed a one-year contract with India's I-League side NEROCA. He made 15 appearances for the club, and scored his first I-League goal against Gokulam Kerala.

Career statistics

References

1997 births
Living people
Trinidad and Tobago footballers
Trinidad and Tobago international footballers
Association football defenders
TT Pro League players
NEROCA FC players
I-League players
Ma Pau Stars S.C. players
Central F.C. players
North East Stars F.C. players
Trinidad and Tobago expatriate footballers
Trinidad and Tobago expatriate sportspeople in India
Expatriate footballers in India